The 1904 Vanderbilt Commodores football team represented Vanderbilt University during the 1904 Southern Intercollegiate Athletic Association football season. The team's head coach was Dan McGugin, who served his first season in that capacity.  Members of the Southern Intercollegiate Athletic Association, the Commodores played six home games in Nashville, Tennessee and finished the season with a record of 9–0.

The 1904 Vanderbilt team scored an average of 52.7 points per game, the most in college football that season, and allowed just four points, all surrendered in their game against Missouri-Rolla. The team had a strong claim to the Southern championship, as the elevens of Georgetown and Virginia played few southern schools.

Before the season
The Commodores hired former Michigan guard Dan McGugin, a protege and son-in-law of Michigan coach Fielding H. Yost. Like Yost, McGugin utilized a short punt formation. Sportswriter Fuzzy Woodruff once wrote "The plain facts of the business are that McGugin stood out in the South like Gulliver among the native sons of Lilliput... There was no foeman worthy of the McGugin steel."

Vanderbilt alumnus Myles P. O'Connor wrote of Dan Blake, who "played left half for Vanderbilt, '04, being taken from left end, which position he played in '03. End is his position; he is heavy, weighing about 170, is fast, a good tackler, advances the ball well, and is a fair punter."

Schedule

Season summary

Mississippi A&M
In his first career game, McGugin's team defeated Mississippi A&M, 61–0.

Georgetown
In the second week of play, Georgetown of Kentucky was defeated 66–0.

Mississippi
Vanderbilt defeated Mississippi 69–0. Both sides had players removed for roughness. "The whole South read that  69–0 score and gasped." McGugin remains the only coach in NCAA history to win his first three games by 60 points.

The starting lineup was D. Blake (left end), Taylor (left tackle), Sibley (left guard), Stone (center), Brown (right guard), Graham (right tackle), I. Brown (right end), Kyle (quarterback), Costen (left halfback), Craig (right halfback), Hamilton (fullback).

Missouri Mines

Sources:

The Commodores beat the Missouri Mines 29–4. All scoring was done in the first half. The Missouri school once got the ball on Vanderbilt's 8-yard line. Unable to go any further, Wilson dropped back and made an 18-yard drop kick, the only points scored on the Commodores all season.

The starting lineup was I. Brown (left end), Taylor (left tackle), Pritchard (left guard), Stone (center), Sibley (right guard), Graham (right tackle), Costen (right end), Kyle (quarterback), Blake (left halfback), Craig (right halfback), Hamilton (fullback).

Centre
Vanderbilt easily beat Centre 97–0. The first score came on Vanderbilt's kickoff to Centre. Dan Blake recovered the ball for a touchdown.

The starting lineup was I. Brown (left end), Taylor (left tackle), Pritchard (left guard), Patterson (center), B. Brown (right guard), Graham (right tackle), Hamilton (right end), Haygood (quarterback), Blake (left halfback), Craig (right halfback), Manier (fullback).

Tennessee
The Commodores defeated the rival Vols 22–0. Ed Hamilton and Manier alternated against Jones Beene, easily taking care of him.

The starting lineup was I. Brown (left end), Taylor (left tackle), Pritchard (left guard), Patterson (center), B. Brown (right guard), Graham (right tackle), Hamilton (right end), Haygood (quarterback), Blake (left halfback), Craig (right halfback), Manier (fullback).

Nashville

Sources:

Vanderbilt defeated the Nashville Garnet and Blue 81–0. Capt Biddle of the Nashville team said "We were outclassed too far in weight, besides were not as aggressive as Vanderbilt. Their line bucking was not to be denied, and after they had thrown their weight on our line, it weakened and went to pieces."

The starting lineup was I. Brown (left end), Taylor (left tackle), Stone (left guard), Patterson (center), B. Brown (right guard), Graham (right tackle), Hamilton (right end), Haygood (quarterback), Blake (left halfback), Craig (right halfback), Manier (fullback).

Central
Vanderbilt then beat Central 22–0.

Sewanee
Vanderbilt faced rival and previously undefeated Sewanee Tigers for the championship of the south. Vanderbilt won 27–0. Vanderbilt's backfield starred. Dan Blake had many gains, and Honus Craig twice had his jersey torn from his body.
The 6,500 attendants  made the crowd a sea of colors.

The starting lineup was I. Brown (left end), Taylor (left tackle), Stone (left guard), Patterson (center), T. Brown (right guard), Graham (right tackle), Hamilton (right end), Kyle (quarterback), Blake (left halfback), Craig (right halfback), Manier (fullback).

Postseason
A postseason match between Vanderbilt and Auburn to decide a Southern championship was forbidden by the SIAA.

Personnel

Depth chart
The following chart provides a visual depiction of Vanderbilt's lineup during the 1904 season with games started at the position reflected in parenthesis. The chart mimics a short punt formation while on offense, with the quarterback under center.

Line

Backfield

References

Bibliography
 
 
 

Vanderbilt
Vanderbilt Commodores football seasons
College football undefeated seasons
Vanderbilt Commodores football